Leirungstinden is a mountain in Vågå Municipality in Innlandet county, Norway. The mountain is surrounded by several other notable mountains including Nordre Knutsholstinden, Store Knutsholstinden, and Vesle Knutsholstinden to the northwest; Skarvflytindene to the northeast; Leirungskampen and Kalvehøgde to the southeast; and Kvitskardtinden and Langedalstinden to the east.

The mountain has two main peaks.

See also
List of mountains of Norway by height

References

Jotunheimen
Vågå
Mountains of Innlandet